Aerotech News and Review Inc., established in February 1986, is a bi-weekly aerospace trade journal and publishing company with corporate headquarters in Lancaster, California in the heart of America's “Aerospace Valley”.
Aerotech News is currently publishing 4 base newspapers in addition to their flagship publication, Aerotech News and Review. Recently, the company began to expand their operations by increasing their Web presence.
The company now has a multimedia division and owns a variety of domains that offer international, national, and regional aerospace and defense-related news.

Aerotech provides information about new aerospace technology and developments and also includes features on noteworthy people, and businesses that affect the aerospace community. Their primary goal is to inform their readers about events that have a direct effect on them, their jobs and their companies. Aerotech has offices in California, Arizona and Nevada.

History

Aerotech News and Review, Inc. was founded by Paul and Lisa Kinison in 1986. In February of that year, the first edition of Antelope Valley Aerospace — now Aerotech News and Review — hit the newsstands. When the first issues hit the stands, the response from readers and advertisers was tremendous. In June 1987, the name was changed to Aerotech News and Review to reflect a more professional readership and growing service area.

In August 1989, Aerotech published its first single-focus, magazine-style, special edition that covered the first flight of the B-2 stealth bomber, a history of Northrop and an overview of flying wings of the past. Since then Aerotech has published several other magazine-style issues focusing on specific topics too lengthy to cover in newspaper-fashion, with military air show publications being a favorite.

In 1990, the company was awarded the contract to publish its first military newspaper, the Edwards Air Force Base Desert Wings. A highlight in the company's history was when they acquired the contract for the Thunderbolt, a publication for Luke Air Force Base, AZ, which had been held by the prior publisher for 30 years.

In 2009, the company launched its multimedia division. This new addition has allowed Aerotech News and Review to remain stable while many other newspaper publishing companies have had to close to their doors.

Today, Aerotech News and Review, Inc. publishes a total of five military and defense newspapers. What started as a monthly publication focusing on aerospace and defense in California's Antelope Valley, has grown to become a bi-weekly newspaper with a Web presence that attracts readers from around the world.

Military newspapers published by Aerotech News and Review, Inc.
Desert Lightning News, published the first Friday of every month covering Davis-Monthan AFB and surrounding high tech and defense companies, Tucson, AZ
The High Desert Warrior, published electronically the first Friday of every month for Fort Irwin, Barstow, CA
Desert Lightning News - Southern Nevada edition, published alternate Fridays for Nellis AFB, Las Vegas, Nev., Creech AFB, Nev., and the Las Vegas veterans community.
Thunderbolt, published the first Friday of every month for Luke AFB, Phoenix, AZ
Aerotech News and Review, published the first and third Friday of every month covering the Antelope Valley, CA

External links

1986 establishments in California
Science and technology magazines published in the United States
Aviation magazines
Biweekly magazines published in the United States
Magazines established in 1986
Magazines published in Los Angeles